Booroobin is a locality split between the Moreton Bay Region and the Sunshine Coast Region in Queensland, Australia.

Geography 
Booroobin is the source of the Stanley River and the Mary River.  A section of Bellthorpe National Park is in the south east of the locality.

History
The origin of the name Booroobin may be from the Kabi word booroothabbin, meaning "forest oak tree", or another Indigenous word meaning "scrub possum".

Booroobin State School opened on 8 October 1919 and closed in August 1953.

The Booroobin Sudbury School opened on 1996 and closed on 4 December 2003.

The median age was 45 years, 8 years above the national median of 37. 73.9% of people living in Booroobin were born in Australia. The other top responses for country of birth were England 6.1%, New Zealand 3.7%, Finland 1.4%, Lebanon 1%, Hungary 1%. 90.8% of people spoke only English at home; the next most common languages were Hungarian (1.4%), 1% Croatian (1%) and Italian (1%).

Education
There are no schools in Booroobin. The nearest government primary schools are Maleny State School in Maleny to the north-east, Peachester State School in neighbouring Peachester to the east, and Conondale State School in neighbouring Conondale to the north-west. The nearest government secondary school is Maleny State High School in Maleny.

Amenities
Policeman Spur Environmental Reserve is a nature reserve established to protect koalas.

References

Further reading 

  — includes Booroobin State School

External links 

 

Suburbs of Moreton Bay Region
Suburbs of the Sunshine Coast Region
Localities in Queensland